Eching station is a railway station in the municipality of Eching, located in the Freising district in Upper Bavaria, Bavaria, Germany.

References

External links

Munich S-Bahn stations
Buildings and structures in Freising (district)
Railway stations in Germany opened in 1889
1889 establishments in Bavaria